The Convent of las Comendadoras de Santiago (Spanish: Convento de las Comendadoras de Santiago) is a convent located in Madrid, Spain. It was declared Bien de Interés Cultural in 1970.

References 

Buildings and structures in Universidad neighborhood, Madrid
Convents in Spain
Bien de Interés Cultural landmarks in Madrid